Jeremy Overbeek Bloem (born 26 August 1980 in the Netherlands) is a Dutch footballer who now works as Head of scouting SIA at Soccer Insight Agency in his home country.

Career

Overbeek Bloem started his senior career with SBV Vitesse. In 2000, he signed for De Graafschap in the Dutch Eredivisie, where he made one league appearance and scored zero goals. After that, he played for South African club Ajax Cape Town and Dutch clubs Door Ons Vrienden Opgericht, VV Bennekom, De Treffers, AFC Ajax (amateur), JOS Watergraafsmeer, VUC,VV DUNO and still playing for Ajax Amsterdam (amateurs)

References

External links 
 A 'Jeremy juggle' for Ajax coach
 Shape up or ship out, Ajax CEO tells players
 Duno-spits Jeremy Overbeek Bloem schittert bij EMM
 Trainer JOS/W heeft genoeg van spelersgedrag
 Voetbalnederland Profile
 Dutch Players Abroad Profile

1980 births
Dutch footballers
Association football midfielders
Living people
SBV Vitesse players
De Graafschap players
Cape Town Spurs F.C. players
VV DOVO players
De Treffers players
AFC Ajax (amateurs) players
VV DUNO players
JOS Watergraafsmeer players